Maribel Pérez (born 29 January 1976), best known by her stage name Belle Perez, is a Belgian-Spanish musician and songwriter.

Born in Neerpelt to Spanish parents as María Isabelle Pérez Cerezo, the Flemish singer was discovered for her musical talents by Patrick Renier at a local talent show in 1997 at the age of 21. In 1999 she participated in the Belgian preselections of the Eurovision Song Contest and from then on Belle's career in music took off. She started off in pop music but in 2002 she changed her style to Latino/pop and went live on stage with her own "Baila Perez"-band. The album that came with it was an instant success and remained on the top spot in the Belgian charts for several weeks.

As of 2006, she has achieved a relatively high level of fame in her native Belgium and the Netherlands. She has also become the presenter of a popular Dutch music show. Perez participated in the Belgian tryouts for the 2006 Eurovision Song Contest, but ended up getting 3rd place. Her newest album Gotitas De Amor was released on 23 August 2006.
In December 2006 she released her 4th single of "Gotitas de amor", called "Hoy (Le pido a dios)", a ballad.

On 5 May she will be performing another "Mega Latino"-Concert in the Sportpaleis Antwerp. She will be performing in front of about 15,000 people. According to some articles on her fan-site she is planning to release a CD in Germany, Austria and Switzerland upcoming summer. She has already signed a contract. Due to some rumours "El mundo bailando" is going to be the first single in Germany, Austria and Switzerland.

Before summer she will release another single from her album "Gotitas De Amor" in Belgium and Netherlands which will be "Amor Latino" and it peaked in Belgium on Position 11.

In June 2007 she released her first album "Gotitas De Amor" and the first single "El Mundo Bailando" in Germany, Austria and Switzerland. In the meantime she recorded a new single called "Djolei! Djolei!" which was released on 15 June 2007 in Belgium and Netherlands. Once again it is a song for the upcoming summer and so she is heading again for her next Radio 2-Summer-Award-Trophy in August 2007.
She also posed twice for the men's magazine FHM.

In 2008 Belle Pérez and her spouse Mario Winters, with whom she had been a couple as early as 1995 and whom she married in the deepest secret in 2000, broke up after an 8-year marriage. Some months later Belle met 25-year-old Dutch jewel designer Wouter van der Horst in Antwerp, and they have been going steady since then.

Belle released her new album "Gipsy" in 2008 and made the top10 in both Belgium and The Netherlands. Appreciation in The Netherlands for her music grows and tours bring Belle more to there than to Belgium. In 2009 Belle celebrates her 10-year career. A book has been published containing her ups and downs in the last 10 years and a DVD has been released of a concert without any audience. At the same time a big concert was announced for the fall of 2009. However, in September 2009 it was announced that the big concert originally planned is downsized: a smaller concert hall but a sold-out crowd. Belle and her team state that she will go in a new direction with her music and that she wants to try new international adventures. She separates from her manager at that time, Patrick Renier, and goes on with Hugo Foets who also has been in the background.

For the second year in a row she is asked to be a special musical guest in the Holiday on Ice Shows. In 2008 she did them in Belgium, in 2009 in The Netherlands. After these shows she will focus on her new tour in The Netherlands: a theater tour "Latino Mundial".

Discography

Albums

Singles

DVDs
Baila Perez (2003)
The Best of Belle Perez (2005)Gold (16.000 sold copies in Belgium)
Mega Latino Concert – Sportpaleis Antwerpen (2006)
Diez (2009)

Awards and achievements
2000 – Zamu Award – "Best Pop Artist"
2002 – Golden Award for single "Me & You" (both in The Netherlands & Belgium)
2002 – Zomerhit Award 'Me And You' Ft Jody Bernal
2003 – Platinum Award for "Baila Perez"
2003 – Zomerhit Award 'Enamorada'
2004 – Zomerhit Award 'Light of My Life'
2005 – Zomerhit Award 'Que Viva La Vida'
2005 – Radio 2 Zomerhit "Favorite of the public" Award
2005 – TMF Award – "Best Female Artist"
2006 – Zomerhit Award Radio 2 'Ave Maria'
2006 – Radio 2 Zomerhit "Favorite of the public" Award

Tours
Bailando 2006 (Belgium&Netherlands)May 2006 – November 2006
The Best of Belle Perez Live 2005/2006 (Belgium&Netherlands) August 2005 – March 2006
Bailando Tour 2006 (Belgium&Netherlands) March – September 2006
Latin Fever Tour 2006/2007 (Belgium&Netherlands) September 2006 – March 2007
Summer Tour 2007 (Netherlands) March – July 2007
Latin Days Tour 2007 (Netherlands) August 2007 – November 2007
Gipsy Live Tour 2008 (Belgium&Netherlands) December 2007 – January 2008
Gipsy Live Tour 2008, Part Two (Netherlands) January 2008 – April 2008
Diez Tour (Netherlands) January 2009 – April 2009
Special Guest @ Holiday on Ice (Netherlands) October 2009 – January 2010
Latino Mundial (Netherlands) January 2010 – April 2010

References

External links
 
 
  Belle Perez at MySpace
 Booking Agency
 Fansite

1976 births
Living people
21st-century Belgian women singers
21st-century Belgian singers
20th-century Belgian women singers
20th-century Belgian singers
People from Neerpelt
Belgian singer-songwriters
Belgian people of Spanish descent
English-language singers from Belgium
Spanish-language singers